Alexander Alexeevich Veledinsky (Александр Алексеевич Велединский, born 27 July 1959 in Gorky) is a Russian film director and screenwriter. He directed several films, but is most famous for The Geographer Drank His Globe Away (2013). The film won five Nika Awards (including the best film), five prizes at Kinotavr festival, and many other awards.

References

1959 births
Russian film directors
Living people